Mateus Ferreira da Silva (born 3 July 1995 in Marilac) is a Brazilian footballer who plays for Ituano as a defender.

Career statistics

References

External links

1995 births
Living people
Brazilian footballers
Association football defenders
Ituano FC players